Battle of Florida may refer to:

 Capture of HMS Epervier, an 1814 naval battle off the coast of Cape Canaveral, Florida, during the War of 1812
 Battle of La Florida, a battle fought at Florida, Santa Cruz Department, during the Bolivian War of Independence in 1814
 Battle of Olustee, the largest battle fought in Florida during the American Civil War in 1863
 Battle of Florida, one of two battles fought near the town of Florida, Missouri, during the American Civil War
 Lightning–Panthers rivalry, a rivalry between the Tampa Bay Lightning and Florida Panthers of the National Hockey League